"I Loved You" ( - Ya vas lyubíl) is a poem by Alexander Pushkin written in 1829 and published in 1830. It has been described as "the quintessential statement of the theme of lost love" in Russian poetry, and an example of Pushkin's respectful attitude towards women.

Text

Cyrillic 
Я вас любил: любовь ещё, быть может,
В душе моей угасла не совсем;
Но пусть она вас больше не тревожит;
Я не хочу печалить вас ничем.
Я вас любил безмолвно, безнадежно,
То робостью, то ревностью томим;
Я вас любил так искренно, так нежно,
Как дай вам Бог любимой быть другим.

Romanization 
Ya vas lyubíl: lyubóv' eshchyó, byt' mózhet,
V dushé moyéy ugásla ne sovsém;
No pust' oná vas ból'she ne trevózhit;
Ya ne khochú pechálit' vas nichém.
Ya vas lyubíl bezmólvno, beznadézhno,
To róbost'yu, to révnost'yu tomím;
Ya vas lyubíl tak ískrenno, tak nézhno,
Kak day vam Bokh lyubímoy byt' drugím.

Summary of the poem
Pushkin expresses his affectionate feelings towards a lady in this poem.  The poet is melancholy about his unrequited love, and lets go knowing that the object of his affections can never love him back, so he wishes her to one day possess the kind of love that he has for her.
The poet is not selfish and doesn't want to fight to get the girl.  He just wants to keep her in his heart for a while.  The greatest test of love is the ability to wish good for the other person even if you lose them.

Cultural references

Settings in music
 "I Loved You", a song by the composer Dargomyzhsky 1832
 "I Loved You", a song by the composer Alexander Alyabyev 1834
 "I Loved You", a song by the composer Boris Sheremetev 1859
 "I Loved You," a song by the composer and arranger Claus Ogermann 1973

In film
The poem has various references in Soviet and Russian film. Most recently in I Loved You, a trilogy of documentaries by Viktor Kossakovsky.

References

External links
 

Poetry by Aleksandr Pushkin
1830 poems